Antara Mali is an Indian actress, director, and screenwriter, who predominantly works in Hindi films, and has also acted in a Malayalam and Telugu films.

Early and personal life
Antara Mali was born in Mumbai to a well known Indian photographer Jagdish Mali. She is married to Che Kurrien, the editor of GQ magazine since 12 June 2009.

Mali's father had a history of diabetes and other illness. On being contacted after he was reported found disoriented in the streets, Antara Mali claimed that she was not in a position to take responsibility for her parent as she was soon to become a mother.

Mali gave birth to a baby girl, on 1 May 2012, at the Breach Candy hospital in Mumbai and refuses to share her personal life in public.

Career
Antara Mali made her acting debut in the 1998 film Dhoondte Reh Jaaoge!. The film, however, flopped. The next year was released her film Prema Katha directed by Ram Gopal Varma. Afterwards, Varma became Mali's frequent collaborator appearing in several of his films such as Mast (1999), Road (2002), Company (2002) and Darna Mana Hai (2003). Although Mali's performances were praised by critics, most of them did not do well at the box office. Mali paid her tribute to Madhuri Dixit by playing an aspiring actress inspired by Madhuri in the 2003 film Main Madhuri Dixit Banna Chahti Hoon. She received a Filmfare nomination for the Best Actress in a Supporting Role for Company.

She discontinued her acting career in 2005 after her last film Mr Ya Miss (which she had also written and directed) was received poorly and critically panned. 
 
In 2010, she made a comeback to films with ...And Once Again directed by Amol Palekar and since then has once again not been active in films.

Filmography

Actor

Director and story writer

References

External links
 

Indian film actresses
Living people
Year of birth missing (living people)
Actresses in Malayalam cinema
Actresses in Telugu cinema
Actresses in Hindi cinema